Sjölander is a surname. Notable people with the surname include:

Jonas Sjölander (born 1965), Swedish curler
Therese Sjölander (born 1981), Swedish ice hockey player
Waldemar Sjölander (1908–1988), Swedish painter

See also
8683 Sjölander, a main belt asteroid
Lisbeth Sjölander, fictional character in the Millennium series.